The Bolivian Practical Shooting Federation, Spanish Federación Boliviana de Tíro Práctico (FBTP), is the Bolivian association for practical shooting under the International Practical Shooting Confederation.

External links 
 Official homepage of the Bolivian Practical Shooting Federation

References 

Regions of the International Practical Shooting Confederation
Practical Shooting